The Valley (al-wadi) is a 2014 Lebanese drama film written and directed by Ghassan Salhab. It was selected to be screened in the Contemporary World Cinema section at the 2014 Toronto International Film Festival and received its world premiere on 4 September 2014.

Cast
 Carol Abboud as Carole
 Fadi Abi Samra as Marwan
 Aouni Kawas as Hikmat
 Carlos Chahine as Accident Man
 Rodrigue Sleiman as Armed Man
 Ahmad Ghossein as Armed Man
 Mounzer Baalbaki as Ali
 Yumna Marwan as Maria

References

External links
 

2014 films
2014 drama films
2010s Arabic-language films
Films directed by Ghassan Salhab
Lebanese drama films